Karehgah may refer to either of two villages in Iran:

Karehgah-ye Pain